Wei Cheng may refer to:

Wei Zheng (580–643), Tang dynasty statesman and historian. His name is rendered as "Wei Cheng" in Wade–Giles.
Cheng Wei (born 1983), Chinese business executive. His surname is Cheng.
Fortress Besieged, a 1947 Chinese novel by Qian Zhongshu

See also
Weicheng (disambiguation)